Oecus is the Latinized form of Greek oikos, used by Vitruvius for the principal hall or salon in a Roman house, which was used occasionally as a triclinium for banquets.

When of great size it became necessary to support its ceiling with columns; thus, according to Vitruvius, the tetrastyle oecus had four columns; in the Corinthian oecus there was a row of columns on each side, virtually therefore dividing the room into nave and aisles, the former being covered over with a barrel vault. The Egyptian oecus had a similar plan, but the aisles were of less height, so that clerestory windows were introduced to light the room, which, as Vitruvius states, presents more the appearance of a basilica than of a triclinium.

Vitruvius distinguishes four types of oecus:

 Tetrastylos: with four columns;
 Corinthian: with a row of columns supporting an architrave topped with a cornice and a vaulted ceiling;
 Egyptian: particularly magnificent form of the oecus, with columns running all around, which support a gallery also provided with columns;
 Cycicene (κυζίκηνοι from Cyzicus, an ancient city in Mysia): a very spacious, north-facing garden oecus common among the Greeks.

See also
House of the Faun
House of the Vettii

References

Attribution

Ancient Roman architecture
Rooms